Kylie Whitehead (born 1994) is a female international Australian lawn bowler.

Whitehead is of English and Walpiri background. She was raised in Chiltern in north-east Victoria by her father's parents.

Whitehead is a physiotherapist and studied physiotherapy at Charles Sturt University.

Bowls career
Whitehead began playing bowls in 2010 at Wodonga Bowls Club alongside her grandfather.

Whitehead won the 2019 World Singles Champion of Champions beating Debbie White in the final. She was the 2017 Australian National Bowls Championships singles winner and has played over 100 state matches for Victoria.

References

Australian female bowls players
Living people
1995 births
People from Wodonga
Indigenous Australian sportspeople
Charles Sturt University alumni
21st-century Australian women